Calamus–Wheatland Community School District is a public school district headquartered in Wheatland, Iowa.

Most of the district is in Clinton County with a portion in Scott County. The district serves Wheatland, Calamus, and Toronto.

Schools
Calamus–Wheatland Elementary Attendance Center
Calamus–Wheatland High School.

History
The district was established on July 1, 1990, by the merger of the Calamus and Wheatland school districts.

References

External links
 Calamus–Wheatland Community School District

School districts in Iowa
Education in Clinton County, Iowa
Education in Scott County, Iowa
1990 establishments in Iowa
School districts established in 1990